The 1982 Derby City Council election took place on 6 May 1982 to elect members of Derby City Council in England. This was on the same day as other local elections. 15 of the council's 44 seats were up for election. The Labour Party retained control of the council.

Overall results

|-
| colspan=2 style="text-align: right; margin-right: 1em" | Total
| style="text-align: right;" | 15
| colspan=5 |
| style="text-align: right;" | 49,486
| style="text-align: right;" |

Ward results

Abbey

Allestree

Alvaston

Babington

Blagreaves

Boulton

Breadsall

Darley

Littleover

Mackworth

Mickleover

Normanton

Osmanton

Sinfin

Spondon

References

1982 English local elections
May 1982 events in the United Kingdom
1982
1980s in Derbyshire